Sturisoma graffini is a species of catfish in the family Loricariidae. It is native to South America, where it occurs in the Madre de Dios River basin in Peru. It was described in 2018 by Alejandro Londoño-Burbano of the Federal University of Rio de Janeiro on the basis of its distinctive coloration and morphology. Its specific name, graffini, honors the singer and evolutionary biologist Greg Graffin. FishBase does not yet list this species.

References 

Loricariidae
Fish described in 2018
Catfish of South America
Fish of Peru